Peloteros is a 2006 Peruvian–Cuban sports action comedy-drama film directed by Coco Castillo and written by Castillo & Max Gamero. It stars Joel Ezeta, Marco Antonio Solís, Christian Ruiz, Stefano Tosso, Frank Mac Bride, Yamir Londres, Mónica Cabrejos and Maricarmen Marín. It narrates the adventures of a group of adolescents during the 90s in a crowded neighborhood in Lima. Most of the film is centered around the sport that boys like the most: soccer. The name of the film, "Peloteros", is the same slang used in Peru to define a group of men, regardless of age, who try to play soccer at any time possible.

Plot 
In a neighborhood of Breña, Lima, a group of baseball players always played on Sundays with more skilled players, and they lost. The group was made up of Norman (Joel Ezeta), Luchito (Marco Antonio Solís), "Vargas Llosita", the intellectual of the group (Christian Ruiz); Aldo (Stefano Tosso), the Black (Frank Mac Bride) and the Chinese (Yamir London). Despite that, the boys celebrated, relaxed drinking.

But there are difficulties that arise: Luchito tells his friends that he will soon move to the United States, but they are in need of money for their passage and their studies; Norman witnesses the physical and sexual abuse that his alcoholic father Ramiro (Juan Manuel Ochoa) inflicts on his mother, Rosa (Mónica Cabrejos).

The young baseball players long to sign up for a soccer championship and win said competition, demonstrating the friendship they have, the passion they feel for the sport, and the love they seek to have with women. Among this story (narrated by Vargas Llosita), there are other feats of the group of adolescents, being funny or serious that will remain for a lifetime and those of the young boys.

Cast 
The actors participating in this film are:

 Joel Ezeta as Norman
 Marco Antonio Solis as Luchito
 Christian Ruiz as Vargas Llosita
 Stefano Tosso as Aldo
 Frank Mac Bride as Black
 Yamir London as Chino
 Maricarmen Marín as Marlene
 Mónica Cabrejos as Rosa
 Juan Manuel Ochoa as Ramiro
 Javier Echevarría as Carlos
 Ricky Tosso as Paquito
 Renzo Schuller as Norman (adult)

Release 
The film premiered on June 29, 2006, in Lima, Peru. In Cuba, Peloteros was shown at the Cine Pobre Film Festival in April 2007. It was then released on DVD in 2007, as was its North American edition of the same year by Laguna Productions.

In Chile, it was chosen as the Best Feature Film at the Second Social Film and Human Rights Festival in 2008.

Soundtrack

References

External links 

 

2006 films
2006 action films
2006 comedy-drama films
Peruvian sports films
Peruvian action films
Peruvian comedy-drama films
Cuban sports films
Cuban comedy-drama films
2000s Peruvian films
2000s Spanish-language films
Films set in Peru
Films shot in Peru
Films about sportspeople
Films about friendship